Sahasa Veerudu Sagara Kanya  is a 1996 Indian Telugu language film directed by K. Raghavendra Rao. It stars Venkatesh, Shilpa Shetty and Malashree, with music composed by M. M. Keeravani. The film was produced by Burugapalli Sivarama Krishna under the Sri Venkateswara Art Films banner. The film was dubbed in Tamil as Kanavu Kanni.

Synopsis
The film is about Ravi Chandra, the film's hero and Sagara Kanya, a mermaid. Malashree plays Ganga, Ravi's cousin who loves him. They stay with some comedians in a house near the seashore. Kaikala Satyanarayana, the villain of the film, tries to acquire a ship which sank with much treasure on board.

He associates himself with a witch who helps him in finding the treasure. After a few attempts, the witch finds out that the treasure can be recovered with the help of a mermaid. Accidentally one day Sagara comes on to land from the water and loses her mermaid body. She transforms into a beautiful woman. Whenever water is spilled over her, however, she turns back into a mermaid.

On land, she becomes involved with the hero, Venkatesh. She is named as Bangaram. Bangaram starts loving Ravi. The witch learns about Sagara and informs Kaikala that only a mermaid can find the treasure.

The film continues with Bangaram being harassed and with Ravi's adventures. In the end, Ravi wins over the evil elements. Bangaram returns to the sea uniting Ravi and his cousin.

Cast

 Venkatesh as Ravi Chandra
 Shilpa Shetty as Bangaram, mermaid
 Malashree as Ganga
 Kaikala Satyanarayana as Bangaru Raju
 Kota Srinivasa Rao as Mutyalu
 Srihari as Ratnalu
 Brahmanandam
 Babu Mohan as Nallodu
 Sudhakar as Lingaraju
 Ali
 Dharmavarapu Subramanyam as Police Inspector
 Rallapalli
 Ananth
 Gundu Hanumantha Rao as Gundu
 Suthivelu
 Garimalla Visweswara Rao as Pottivadu
 Mada 
 Jagga Rao
 Vijayalalitha as Malakpeta Manchala

Soundtrack

Telugu version

Music composed by M. M. Keeravani. Music released on MELODY MAKERS Audio Company.

Tamil version (Kanavu Kanni)

All the lyrics are written by Vairamuthu.

References

External links
 

1996 films
Films directed by K. Raghavendra Rao
Films scored by M. M. Keeravani
Films shot in Visakhapatnam
Films shot in Hyderabad, India
Indian fantasy comedy-drama films
Indian romantic comedy-drama films
Indian romantic fantasy films
1990s fantasy comedy-drama films
1990s romantic fantasy films
Films about mermaids
1990s Telugu-language films
1996 romantic comedy-drama films